Madhumita may refer to:

People
Madhumita Bisht, Indian badminton player
Madhumita Kumari, Indian archer
Madhumita Mohanta, Indian chef
Madhumita Raut, Indian dancer
Madhumita Sarkar, Indian actress and model
Mitali Madhumita, Indian army officer
Madhumitha, Indian Tamil actress
Madhumitha (director), Indian Tamil director

Other uses
Modhumita, Bangladeshi movie theater